Kelly Ann Lindsey (born September 3, 1979) is an American soccer coach and former defender who played for the United States women's national soccer team and the San Jose CyberRays of Women's United Soccer Association (WUSA). She is currently the Royal Moroccan Football Federation women's football director.

Playing career

College
Lindsey attended and played college soccer for the University of Notre Dame.  A tough defender with the Fighting Irish, Lindsey backstopped the team to a runners-up finish in the 1999 NCAA Division I Women's Soccer Championship.

Club
From 2001 to 2003, Lindsey played for the San Jose CyberRays of the professional Women's United Soccer Association. She was the number one pick in the 2001 WUSA Supplemental Draft. In 2001 the CyberRays won the championship game, beating Atlanta Beat on a penalty shootout. Soccer America magazine named Lindsey the 2001 Rookie of the Year.

After the 2003 season, Lindsey reluctantly retired from professional soccer at the age of 23, due to persistent knee injuries.

International
Lindsey's first appearance on the United States women's national soccer team was on January 7, 2000, in an 8–1 win over Czech Republic in Melbourne, Australia.  She collected a total of four caps over the following two years, but was not included in the US squads for the 2000 Sydney Olympics, or the 2003 FIFA Women's World Cup.

Managing career
In 2003, Lindsey coached the University of Colorado to their first ever NCAA tournament selection. Then she trained the University of Texas and Saint Mary's (2006-2008). In 2009, she took the lead of Sky Blue FC, part of the newly formed Women's Professional Soccer League after Head Coach Ian Sawyers was terminated. Lindsay resigned with two weeks left in the regular season without explanation and Sky Blue FC went on to win the Championship.
Lindsey has also coached the USA U21 women's team as well as on the USA U14 national development program.

In 2016, she took the role of Head Coach for the Afghanistan women's national football team.

In February 2019, she was appointed as CONIFA’s First Ever Director of Women's Football.

In 2020, she was named as the Royal Moroccan Football Federation women's football director and head coach of the Morocco women's national football team.

Personal life
Lindsey was nicknamed Boof by players and supporters, owing to her hairstyle.

References

External links
 Profile at Women's United Soccer Association

Living people
1979 births
American women's soccer players
Notre Dame Fighting Irish women's soccer players
United States women's international soccer players
Women's United Soccer Association players
Soccer players from Nebraska
San Jose CyberRays players
Women's association football defenders
Women's Professional Soccer coaches
American women's soccer coaches
Saint Mary's Gaels women's soccer coaches
Afghanistan women's national football team coaches
Sportspeople from Omaha, Nebraska
American expatriates in Afghanistan
American expatriate sportspeople in Morocco
Expatriate football managers in Afghanistan
Expatriate football managers in Morocco
Colorado Buffaloes women's soccer coaches
Texas Longhorns women's soccer coaches
NJ/NY Gotham FC coaches